This is a family tree of Chinese monarchs from the foundation of the Qin dynasty in 221 BCE until the end of the Sixteen Kingdoms period.

Qin dynasty

The Qin dynasty (秦朝) was established in 221 BCE after Qin Shi Huang, King of Qin, conquered his final independent neighbour, the state of Qi. It is now recognised as the first Chinese imperial dynasty in the modern sense of the term; in recognition of this, its rulers were for the first time titled "Emperor" (皇帝), a title of which the components are drawn from legend, higher than the previous title "King" (王). The ancestral name of the family was Ying (嬴), although it is anachronistic to regard this as a family name in the modern sense: it would not have been used together with a given name. The titles of the Qin emperors were literally regnal numbers: "Qin Shi Huang" (秦始皇), in full "Qin Shi Huangdi" (秦始皇帝) means literally "the first Emperor of Qin", "Qin Er Shi" (秦二世), in full "Qin Er Shi Huangdi" (秦二世皇帝) means "the second Emperor of Qin", and so forth.

Han dynasty and Three Kingdoms

Han dynasty, Xin dynasty and Shu Han

Emperor Xian, the last emperor of the Han dynasty, was a descendant of the first emperor Liu Bang. Lasting for over 400 years (the first to last for more than a century), the Han dynasty is regarded as one of the golden ages of Chinese history. The Han dynasty was interrupted by the reign of the usurper Wang Mang, who declared the Xin dynasty (9–23 AD); on this basis, the Han dynasty is generally divided into the Western Han (206 BC – 9 AD and 23–25 AD) and the Eastern Han (25–220 AD). The rulers of the Shu Han, one of the three successor states to the Han dynasty during the Three Kingdoms period, were descended from the Han imperial family, and considered themselves a continuation of the Han dynasty; they are included below.

Cao Wei

Eastern Wu

Jin dynasty and Chu

The following is a family tree for the Jin dynasty, which ruled a unified China during the Western Jin Dynasty (265–316 AD). Although greatly weakened by the War of the Eight Princes during the reign of the developmentally disabled Emperor Hui, when members of the clan fought among themselves for imperial control, and forced Eastwards after the conquest of their capital in 316 AD, the dynasty nonetheless continued in the form of the Eastern Jin Dynasty until 420 AD.

Sixteen Kingdoms

Cheng Han

(Han) Former Zhao

Yan states and Tuyuhun
Legend about affiliations:

Later Zhao

Former Liang

Later Liang

Northern Liang

Western Liang

Former Qin

Later Qin

Western Qin

Southern Liang

Xia

Other states contemporaneous with Sixteen Kingdoms

Dai

Zhai Wei 

Chinese monarchs
Dynasty genealogy
Family trees